Captain Creek is a rural locality in the Gladstone Region, Queensland, Australia.

Geography 
The predominant land use is grazing on native vegetation.

History 
The locality presumably takes its name from the creek which rises in the north of the locality and is a tributary of Oyster Creek which exits to the south-west to Taunton and Round Hill. It is ultimately a tributary of Baffle Creek which enters the Coral Sea between the localities of Rules Beach and Mullet Creek.

Education 
There are no schools in Captain Creek. The nearest primary school is in Agnes Water. The nearest secondary schools are in Miriam Vale (to Year 10) and Rosedale (to Year 12).

References 

Gladstone Region
Localities in Queensland